Hüseyinli is a village in the Sincik District, Adıyaman Province, Turkey. The village is populated by Kurds of the Reşwan tribe and had a population of 758 in 2021.

The hamlets of Akbulut, Armutlu, Demirtepe, Kürik, Kürk, Öztaş and Taraklı are attached to Hüseyinli.

References

Villages in Sincik District
Kurdish settlements in Adıyaman Province